Lorraway is a surname. Notable people with the surname include:

 Ken Lorraway (1956–2007), Australian triple jumper
 Robyn Lorraway (born 1961), Australian long jumper, wife of Ken